The Ma'ayan HaChinuch HaTorani is an education network in Israel, founded in 1984 by the Sephardi Rabbi Ovadia Yosef for the purpose of providing a religious Torah education to the Sephardi community. Rabbi Yosef served as the head of the organization until his death.

It currently operates 130 schools throughout Israel.

The secretary general is Rabbi Moshe Maya. One of its former secretaries general, Rabbi Yitzhak Cohen, currently serves as the deputy finance minister of Israel.

References

Education in Israel
Educational institutions established in 1984
Jewish organizations established in 1984
1984 establishments in Israel